Thakar is an Adiwasi (tribe) of Maharashtra, India. The tribe originally living in the hilly areas of Sahyadri Mountain as a whole is now found all over Maharashtra scattered in search of a livelihood over a long period of time over recent centuries of colonization and industrialisation.Marathi Brahmins originally from Pune district also share the surname Thakar. They used to be the chief pujari at the Kasba Ganapati temple in Pune under the Peshwas.

References

Tribal communities of Maharashtra
Social groups of Maharashtra
Hindu communities
Social groups of India
Ethnic groups in India
Scheduled Tribes of India